A series of mass protests led by students took place at major cities in Indonesia from 23 September 2019, to rally against new legislation that reduces the authority of the Corruption Eradication Commission (KPK), as well as several bills including a new criminal code that penalises extramarital sex and defamation against the president. The protesters consisted of mostly students from over 300 universities, with no association with any particular political parties or groups. The protests were some of the biggest student movement in Indonesia since the 1998 riots that brought down the Suharto regime.

In several cities including Jakarta, Bandung and Padang, protesters clashed with the Indonesian National Police (Polri), resulting in the riot police firing tear gas and water cannons. In the capital city of Jakarta, the police confirmed that at least 254 students and 39 police officers are injured or being treated in hospitals. In Kendari, Southeast Sulawesi, two students died, one of them allegedly being shot during the violent clash. Another three protesters died in Jakarta.

Protests

2019 
While small-scale demonstrations were already held sporadically, mass protests took place on 23 and 24 September, the last two days before the term end of the incumbent parliament members. The protest spread nationwide, including Jakarta, Bandung, Yogyakarta, Surabaya, Malang, Palembang, Medan, Padang, Semarang, Surakarta, Lampung, Aceh, Palu, Bogor, Denpasar, Makassar, Balikpapan, Samarinda, Purwokerto, Tasikmalaya, Kediri, Tanjungpinang, Cirebon, Jombang, and others.

On 18 September 2019, the parliament discussed the bill on the revision of criminal code (RKUHP). The new criminal code has been under the creation for the past few decades, intended to replace the Dutch era set of laws. The amendment was previously introduced in 2015 by Yasonna Laoly, the minister of Law and Human Rights. Since earlier in that year, conservative Islamic groups have been pushing again for an overhaul of the criminal code. The latest proposal includes several laws based on conservative religious interpretations, including the ban on premarital sex, living together outside of marriage, performing black magic, and abortion without reasons of medical emergency and rape. The vote was scheduled to be held on 24 September 2019, but facing the public outcry, the President announced to postpone the vote on 20 September 2019. The draft were finally postponed by the Parliament before the end of their term on 24 September 2019.

2022 
On 6 December 2022, the Indonesian Parliament voted to approve a new criminal code for Indonesia on the basis of decolonization, which repeals the old criminal code and its amendments. Initially, the new code was supposed to pass in 2019, yet amid mass street demonstrations across the country, the process was ultimately halted as President Joko Widodo had asked Parliament to revise problematic clauses. The protest comes as the new criminal code introduced some controversial new laws, such as banning unmarried couple to cohabit; banning the defamation of the president, government ministers and agencies; banning of demonstration without notice; the witchcraft act (article 252); and the privacy act (article 412), etc. Some human rights experts have even called it "a step backward in Indonesian democracy".

The new penal code contains 624 articles, which the government claimed it had spent the past years gathering feedback from stakeholders, experts and the public following a nationwide protest against the code in 2019. The new code, which applies to Indonesians and foreigners alike, will not take immediate effect, but instead, three years after the bill is enacted into law, in which opponents can file requests for judicial review of the code to the Constitutional Court.

On 15 December 2022, students in Tasikmalaya, West Java, temporarily occupied the Regional People's Representative Council office.

On 16 December 2022, students in Bandung, West Java protested in the Regional People's Representatives Council office (DPRD) Bandung, the Demonstrations clashed with the Indonesian Police who splashed water cannon to disperse the protesters. A total of 30 students were arrested.

In another demonstration during the same day, in the MPR/DPR/DPD building student demonstrators commemorated the 1,000 day death toll due to the #ReformasiDiKorupsi demonstration in 2019. "The government and DPR seem to have forgotten that five lives were lost as a result of the wave of rejection of the RKUHP in 2019," said Bayu Satria Utomo, the Chairman of the Student Executive Board of the University of Indonesia (BEM UI).

On 20 December 2022, the Student Executive body throughout Indonesia (BEM-SI) conducted protests near the Presidential Palace in front of the Horse Statue area, Central Jakarta. They brought a coffin and a delman with a photo of the President in front of it. The students said that the coffin symbolizes the "death of democracy".

See also
 Indonesia omnibus law protests

References

Student protests in Indonesia
Protests in Indonesia
2019 protests